Baharipristis is an extinct genus of sawfish-like shark from the Cretaceous period. It contains a singular species, B. bastetiae. It was described from the Cenomanian-aged Bahariya formation of Gebel Ghorabi, Egypt based on distinctive isolated rostral teeth. It shares the formation with at least 9 other genera of Sclerorhynchid Saw-snouted sharks.

References

Sclerorhynchidae
Prehistoric cartilaginous fish genera